Suzanne Bernert (born 26 September), is a German actress living in India who works primarily in Indian films in various languages. She has acted in Ramdhanu - The Rainbow, Honeymoon Travels Pvt. Ltd. and television serials like 7 RCR and Kasautii Zindagii Kay. She speaks French, Italian, English, German, Spanish, Hindi, Marathi and Bengali. She acted in Colors TV's historical serial Chakravartin Ashoka Samrat as Queen Helena and received nominations and praise for it. She also appeared in the Star Plus serial Yeh Rishta Kya Kehlata Hai. She portrayed Sonia Gandhi on the television  series 7 RCR, and in the Hindi film The Accidental Prime Minister.

Early life and career

Bernert is from Detmold in Germany. Her mother Monika and father Michael, live in Lindau, Germany. When she was 19, she did a three-year acting course under Heidelotte Diehl in Berlin and is a trained ballet dancer. Bernert was main lead in the film Destined Hearts, with Indian filmmaker Anant Duseja in 2003, which was shot entirely in Dubai but never actually released.

She moved to Mumbai in 2005. She can speak Hindi, Marathi and Bengali. Suzanne has worked in an array of television series (including Bengali and Marathi). She is also working in Bengali and Marathi films and serials. Bernert has worked opposite Aamir Khan in a Titan Watches ad. She promoted Jaipur tourism by acting in a short film titled Padharo India. Bernert was the first non-Indian to partake in a Lavani Celebrity Dance Show up to Semi Finals – Dholkichya talavar Reality Show RDP/Logical Thinkers as herself.

Bernert portrayed the role of Sonia Gandhi in film The Accidental Prime Minister which was released on 11 January 2019. She was named the Outstanding Contribution to Indian Cinema and Television in Rajasthan International Film Festival 2018.
Cama Awards Of Gujarat held in Ahmedabad on 1 October 2018 awarded : The International Diva of Bollywood 
 Bernert will be seen in the short film Majnu ki Juliet.

In 2020, Bernert acted in her first web series called State of Siege 26/11 for Zee5. She also opened the Mumbai Oktoberfest as celebrity guest of the German Consulate in Mumbai, India.
Suzanne published her first Short Story called The Diwali Gift End of 21.

Personal life
Bernert married actor Akhil Mishra in a civil court on 3 February 2009. They married again in a traditional way on 30 September 2011.  She had worked with him in movie Kram and serial Mera Dil Dewaana (Doordarshan).

She also holds an Overseas Citizenship of India card following her marriage.

Humanitarian work
Along with Govinda Bernert became part of Narmada Seva Yatra, a campaign by the government of Madhya Pradesh.

Filmography

Films

Television

Web series

References

External links
 
 
 

Living people
People from Detmold
Actresses from Mumbai
German film actresses
German television actresses
German soap opera actresses
German emigrants to India
German expatriates in India
Actresses in Hindi cinema
Actresses in Bengali cinema
Actresses in Marathi cinema
Actresses in Malayalam cinema
Actresses in Hindi television
Actresses in Marathi television
Web series actresses
Female models from Mumbai
German female models
European actresses in India
Actresses of European descent in Indian films
Year of birth missing (living people)
21st-century German actresses